Hou Jizhen (born November 1951) is a retired lieutenant general (zhongjiang) of the People's Liberation Army (PLA) who served as chief of staff of the Shenyang Military Region from 2009 to 2014. He was a representative of 17th National Congress of the Chinese Communist Party.

Biography
Hou was born in Xiajin County, Shandong, in November 1951. He served in the 23rd Army for a long time. In December 2003, he was appointed commander of the 40th Group Army, replacing Wang Guosheng. In December 2005, he was commissioned as commander of the 16th Group Army, succeeding . In June 2009, he rose to become chief of staff of the Shenyang Military Region, and then deputy commander of the region in December 2013, serving in the post until his retirement in December 2014.

He was promoted to the rank of major general (shaojiang) in 2002 and lieutenant general (zhongjiang) in July 2010.

References

1951 births
Living people
People from Xiajin County
People's Liberation Army generals from Shandong